The St. George Utah Temple (formerly the St. George Temple) is a temple of the Church of Jesus Christ of Latter-day Saints (LDS Church) in St. George, Utah. Completed in 1877, it was the church's third temple completed, but the first in Utah, following the migration west of members from Nauvoo, Illinois, following the death of the church's founder, Joseph Smith.

The building is located in the southwestern Utah city of St. George. It was designed by Truman O. Angell and is more similar in its design to the Nauvoo Temple than to the church's later temples. The St. George Temple is the oldest temple still actively used by the church. The St. George Utah Temple was the first temple where church members could receive all temple ordinances for their ancestors.

History
A temple in St. George was announced on November 9, 1871, by church president Brigham Young and was dedicated in 1877. Even though the Salt Lake Temple had been announced and commenced years earlier (1847 and 1853), construction on that temple was not completed until 1893. The St. George Temple was built to satisfy the church's immediate need for an appropriate place for temple ceremonies and ordinances. Because of the pressing need, the building's groundbreaking ceremony was held on the day the temple was announced. It was the third to be completed by the church and the first one in Utah.

Young chose a  plot as the temple site. Builders soon discovered that the chosen site was swampy with numerous underground streams. Young was consulted on moving the site, but he remained firm in the idea that this was the site for the temple. To deal with the swampy site, workers created drains to eliminate as much water as possible. Then they brought lava rock to the site and crushed it into a gravel to create a dry foundation for the temple. This led to a new problem: how to crush the rock. Someone suggested using an old cannon that the city had acquired. The old cannon was made in France and used by Napoleon during his siege on Moscow. During Napoleon's hasty retreat, however, the cannon was left behind. It was later dragged to Siberia, then Alaska, and finally ended up at a fort in California. Members of the Mormon Battalion acquired the cannon, had it mounted on wheels, and brought it to Utah. Today, the old cannon is displayed on the St. George temple grounds. After creating a pulley system, the cannon was used as a pile driver to compact the lava rock and earth and create a firm foundation.

After stabilizing the foundation, work began on the structure. The walls of the temple were built of the red sandstone common to the area and then plastered for a white finish. Local church members worked for over five and a half years to complete the temple. Historians James Allen and Glen Leonard made note of the dedication shown by the pioneers in Southern Utah. The workers opened new rock quarries, cut, hauled and planed timber, and donated one day in ten as tithing labor. Some members donated half their wages to the temple, while others gave food, clothing and other goods to aid those who were working full-time on the building. Women decorated the hallways with handmade rag carpets and produced fringe for the altars and pulpits from Utah-produced silk. It was originally designed with two large assembly halls like the earlier Kirtland and Nauvoo temples. The lower Assembly Hall was partitioned with curtains to provide the ordinance rooms for the endowment ceremony. They also used 17,000 tons of volcanic rock and sandstone, hand-cut and hauled by mule teams.

In honor of the temple, the church's April 1877 general conference was held there. The temple dedication ceremony took place on April 6, 1877. Young presided and Daniel H. Wells, his second counselor in the First Presidency, gave the dedicatory prayer. The St. George Temple was the only one completed while Young was president. Shortly after the dedication and the conference, Young returned to Salt Lake and died on August 29, 1877, at age 76.

In 1938, the lower Assembly Hall was rebuilt with permanent walls dividing it into four ordinance rooms. The four ordinance rooms were later changed into the present three rooms, at the time the endowment ceremony was changed from a live presentation to one presented on film. The cupola was replaced in 1883 after a lightning strike. Renovations were made in 1917, 1938 and 1975. The temple was closed for extensive remodeling in the 1970s and LDS Church president Spencer W. Kimball rededicated it on November 11, 1975.

As announced by the LDS Church on January 25, 2019, the temple closed on November 4, 2019, for renovations that are anticipated to be completed in 2022. Detailed information on the renovations were provided on May 22, 2019, and additions include a new brides’ plaza that will be added to the east side, a new baptistry entrance added on the south side, steel added to the original wood trusses of the temple, and a new heating and cooling system. Demolition crews removed the 20th-century additions to the north and west sides of the temple in February 2020.

Presidents
Notable presidents of the temple include Wilford Woodruff (1877–84); John D. T. McAllister (1884–93); J. Thomas Fyans (1992–95); and Bruce C. Hafen (2010–13).

Access
Temple access is available to church members who hold a current temple recommend, as is the case with all operating temples. An adjacent visitors' center is open to the public. An LDS Church meetinghouse is across the street on the East, which is also open to the public.

See also

The Church of Jesus Christ of Latter-day Saints in Utah
Comparison of temples of The Church of Jesus Christ of Latter-day Saints
Endowment House
List of temples of The Church of Jesus Christ of Latter-day Saints
List of temples of The Church of Jesus Christ of Latter-day Saints by geographic region
Temple architecture (Latter-day Saints)

References

Further reading

External links

St. George Utah Temple Official site
St. George Utah Temple at ChurchofJesusChristTemples.org

19th-century Latter Day Saint temples
Buildings and structures in St. George, Utah
National Register of Historic Places in Washington County, Utah
Churches on the National Register of Historic Places in Utah
Religious buildings and structures completed in 1877
Temples (LDS Church) in Utah
Tourist attractions in Washington County, Utah
1877 establishments in Utah Territory